Qaleh Madreseh (also Romanized as Qal‘eh Madreseh) is a village in Howmeh Rural District, in the Central District of Behbahan County, Khuzestan Province, Iran. At the 2006 census, its population was 201, in 45 families.

References

External link 

Populated places in Behbahan County